Santamaria is a surname.

Santamaria may also refer to:

 Santamaria (band), a Portuguese eurodance band
 Santamaria (footballer) (born 1982), Portuguese footballer
 Santamaria (motorcycles), Italian manufacturer of motorcycles
 Santamaría Bullring, a bull ring in Bogotá, Colombia
 Juan Santamaría International Airport, an airport in Costa Rica

See also
 Sântămăria-Orlea, Hunedoara County, Transylvania, Romania
 Santa Maria (disambiguation)